Lupetidine may refer to:

 2,6-Lupetidine
 3,5-Lupetidine